Brunfelsia is a genus of flowering plants belonging to subfamily Petunioideae of the nightshade family Solanaceae. The 50 or so species have been grouped into the three sections: Brunfelsia (circa 22 species), Franciscea (circa 18 species) and Guianenses (circa 6 species), which differ significantly in both distribution and characteristics, although molecular data have revealed that only two sections are natural (monophyletic), namely the Caribbean section Brunfelsia and a common section for all South American species. Linnaeus named the genus for the early German herbalist Otto Brunfels (1488–1534).  Common names for the genus include raintree, yesterday-today-tomorrow and lady of the night.

Brunfelsia spp. are neotropical shrubs, small trees and (rarely) lianas. The leaves are alternately arranged, simple, and usually oval in shape. The large flowers have salverform corollas with five broad lobes and narrow tubes.

Typical habitat for wild species is light woodland and thickets.

Taxonomy
The genus was described by French botanist and churchman Charles Plumier ex L. and published in Species Plantarum 1: 191 in the year 1753. The type species is Brunfelsia americana.

Description
Shrubs or small trees, without thorns. Leaves simple, entire and petiolate (stalked). Inflorescences in subterminal fascicles or flowers borne singly in leaf axils, often showy and sometimes also night-scented, zygomorphic; calyx campanulate, 5-lobed to approximately half its length; corolla hypocrateriform (having salver-shaped limb above narrow tube), 5-lobed; stamens 4, anthers oblong or elliptical, included and dehiscing longitudinally; ovary bilocular. Fruit a corky berry.

Ornamental use
Species in cultivation include Brunfelsia americana and Brunfelsia pauciflora. Brunfelsia australis is being actively promoted by growers for its tricolored blooms and drought resistance. As its specific name suggests, B. australis is the Brunfelsia species with the most southerly distribution, the plant occurring as far south as the Argentinian province of Buenos Aires.

Chemistry and Toxicity
Like many other species belonging to the Solanaceae, some (possibly all) members of this genus contain toxic and medicinal alkaloids. These are known to be poisonous to domestic animals such as cats, dogs, and horses due to their brunfelsamidine content. Toxicity in dogs manifests with strychnine-like gastrointestinal, neurological and cardiac symptoms.

The roots of certain Brunfelsia species have been designated as containing compounds hazardous to human health according to a compendium published in 2012 by the European Food Safety Authority. These compounds include indole alkaloids of the β-carboline group such as harmine, tetrahydroharmine, harmaline, manacine, manaceine, and also derivatives of N,N-dimethyltryptamine and amidines such as pyrrole 3-carboximidamide.

According to early accounts in the literature, symptoms of poisoning by the medicinal species B. grandiflora include dizziness, exhaustion, nausea, hypersalivation, muscle weakness, lethargy, facial nerve paralysis, mouth pains, swollen tongue, numbness in the extremities, paraesthesias (including tingling and feelings of unbearable coldness) tremors, and blurred vision. At higher does, there are reports of delirium, sustained mental confusion, and possible blindness. Modern reports have compared the experience to the effects of an overdose of nicotine upon non-smokers.

Species
Species include:
Brunfelsia americana – American brunfelsia, lady-of-the-night
Brunfelsia australis – Jasmine of Paraguay
Brunfelsia chiricaspi – chiricaspi
Brunfelsia densifolia – Serpentine Hill raintree
Brunfelsia grandiflora – largeflower brunfelsia, chiricsanango
Brunfelsia jamaicensis
Brunfelsia lactea – vega blanca
Brunfelsia latifolia
Brunfelsia membranacea
Brunfelsia nitida – Cuban raintree
Brunfelsia pauciflora
Brunfelsia plowmaniana
Brunfelsia portoricensis – Puerto Rican raintree
Brunfelsia splendida
Brunfelsia uniflora – manacá

Legal status

United States

Louisiana
Except for ornamental purposes, growing, selling or possessing Brunfelsia spp. is prohibited by Louisiana State Act 159.

Gallery

References

Further reading

 
Solanaceae genera